The Chiusi Painter was an Attic black-figure vase painter, active in the last quarter of the sixth century BC. His real name is not known.

The Chiusi Painter was part of the so-called Leagros Group, the last  major important group of painters in the black-figure style. He is characterised by what John Boardman calls a "boring delicateness"  compared to other artists of the group, failing to reach the standards of the Acheloos Painter for example.

See also
 List of Greek vase painters

Bibliography 
 John Boardman: Schwarzfigurige Vasen aus Athen. Ein Handbuch, Mainz 1977, p. 121

References 

Ancient Greek vase painters